Akudo Sabi  (born 17 November 1986) is a female Nigerian football defender. She was part of the Nigeria women's national football team  at the 2004 Summer Olympics. She was selected for the FIFA U-19 Women's World Championship All-Star Team in 2004. On club level she played for Bayelsa Queens.

See also
 Nigeria at the 2004 Summer Olympics

References

1986 births
Living people
Nigerian women's footballers
Nigeria women's international footballers
Place of birth missing (living people)
Footballers at the 2004 Summer Olympics
Olympic footballers of Nigeria
Women's association football defenders
Bayelsa Queens F.C. players
Igbo people